Hans-George Brase (Hans) (born September 15, 1993) is an American-German basketball player for Hamburg Towers of the Basketball Bundesliga. He stands 6’9’’ (205 cm) tall and plays the forward position.

Career 
Born in Charlottesville, Virginia, Brase spent parts of his early childhood in Germany, where his parents come from, before his family settled in Clover, South Carolina.

Brase attended Gaston Day School in Gastonia, North Carolina and transferred to the Hill School in Pottstown, Pennsylvania in 2010.

He committed to Princeton University in 2011 and joined the Tigers for the 2012–13 season. During his freshman season, he received Ivy League Rookie of the Week honors on December 24, 2012. As a sophomore (2013–14), Brase led the team in rebounding (5.7rpg) and was the team's second-leading scorer with 11.2 points a contest. As a junior (2014–15), Brase once again led the Tigers in rebounding (7.5rpg) and was the team's second-leading scorer with 11.5 points a contest.

In November 2015, prior to his senior season, Brase sustained a torn ACL and missed the entire 2015–16 campaign. He suffered another injury to his right knee in December 2016, which ended his senior season as well as his playing career at Princeton. Brase played five games as a senior, averaging 6.4 points and 2.8 rebounds a contest. As the Ivy League does not allow medical redshirts, he transferred to Iowa State for a fifth year of college basketball.

In Mai 2018, he signed his first contract as a professional basketball player, inking a deal with Mitteldeutscher BC of the German Basketball Bundesliga. In his first season as professional basketball player, Brase averaged 5.2 points and 3.4 rebounds a game in 23 Bundesliga contests. In June 2019, he signed with fellow Bundesliga side Riesen Ludwigsburg. In the 2019–20 season, he reached the Bundesliga finals with Ludwigsburg, where he and his team fell short to Alba Berlin.

Brase signed with Bundesliga team Hamburg Towers on August 4, 2020.

National team 
Brase plays internationally for Germany. In 2013, he attended the under-20 European Championships in Estonia. During the summer of 2014, he played in friendly tournaments across Europe ultimately culminating in a six team tournament in China. He won silver at the 2015 World University Games in South Korea after losing to the Kansas Jayhawks, who were representing the United States, in the gold medal game. Brase led the team in scoring and rebounding as their only defeat in the tournament was to Kansas in double overtime.

Personal info 
Brase's sister Marie-Luise played basketball at Colgate University, his brother Janpeter was a member of the St. Lawrence University basketball team.

References

External links
Iowa State Cyclones bio
Princeton Tigers bio

1993 births
Living people
American men's basketball players
Basketball players from Virginia
German men's basketball players
Hamburg Towers players
Iowa State Cyclones men's basketball players
Mitteldeutscher BC players
People from York County, South Carolina
Power forwards (basketball)
Princeton Tigers men's basketball players
Riesen Ludwigsburg players
Sportspeople from Charlottesville, Virginia
The Hill School alumni